Mikael Pernfors was the defending champion but lost in the quarterfinals to Brad Gilbert.

Aaron Krickstein won in the final 2–6, 6–4, 6–2 against Michael Chang.

Seeds
A champion seed is indicated in bold text while text in italics indicates the round in which that seed was eliminated.

  Michael Chang (final)
  Brad Gilbert (semifinals)
  Tim Mayotte (first round)
  Mats Wilander (first round)
  Aaron Krickstein (champion)
  Kevin Curren (quarterfinals)
  Christo van Rensburg (first round)
  Mikael Pernfors (quarterfinals)

Draw

External links
 1989 Los Angeles Open draw

Los Angeles Open (tennis)
1989 Grand Prix (tennis)
Jack Kramer Open
Jack Kramer Open